"My Next Broken Heart" is a song co-written and recorded by American country music duo Brooks & Dunn. It was released in September 1991 as the second single from their debut album Brand New Man. The song was their second straight Number One single on the country charts.  It was written by Kix Brooks, Don Cook and Ronnie Dunn.

Music video
The music video was directed by Michael Merriman and premiered in October 1991. It was filmed in the same Texas town as the video for "Brand New Man" was filmed.

Cover versions
Country music singer Brad Paisley covered the song from The Last Rodeo Tour

Chart positions
"My Next Broken Heart" debuted at number 63 on the U.S. Billboard Hot Country Singles & Tracks for the week of October 12, 1991.

Year-end charts

Reboot version
In March 2019, Brooks & Dunn released a re-recorded version of "My Next Broken Heart", featuring neotraditional country artist Jon Pardi. The track was the third to be released from Brooks & Dunn's studio album, Reboot. Whereas several of the guest vocalist on Reboot worked with Brooks & Dunn to update the songs they were appearing on, Pardi was "adamant" about not changing a single thing about "My Next Broken Heart" as he was such a big fan of the original version.

References

1991 singles
Brooks & Dunn songs
Jon Pardi songs
Songs written by Kix Brooks
Songs written by Ronnie Dunn
Songs written by Don Cook
Song recordings produced by Don Cook
Song recordings produced by Scott Hendricks
Arista Nashville singles
1991 songs